Colville is a city in Stevens County, Washington, United States. The population was 4,673 at the 2010 census.  It is the county seat of Stevens County.

History
John Work, an agent for The Hudson's Bay Company, established Fort Colvile near the Kettle Falls fur trading site in 1825. It replaced the Spokane House and the Flathead Post as the main trading center on the Upper Columbia River. The area was named for Andrew Colvile, a Hudson's Bay Company governor. The fort continued to be used for some time as a center of mining and transportation/supply support associated with gold rushes in the 1850s, particularly the Fraser Canyon Gold Rush. After it was abandoned in 1870, some buildings stood until as late as 1910. The site was flooded by Lake Roosevelt after construction of the Grand Coulee Dam on the Columbia River.

Americans also wanted to operate in this territory. In the first half of the 19th century, the Oregon boundary dispute (or Oregon question) arose as a result of competing British and American claims to the Pacific Northwest. It was settled by the Oregon Treaty of 1846, which set the new boundary between Canada and the United States at the 49th Parallel, about Forty (40) miles to the north.

In 1859, the U.S. Army established a new Fort Colville at Pinkney City, Washington, about 3 miles NE of the current city of Colville.  That fort was abandoned in 1882. In late 1871, with the resolution of Hudson's Bay Company land claims, Governor Edward Selig Salomon directed John Wynne to accept those lands which extended south to Orin-Rice Road, including some currently part of the City of Colville. With the planned closure of Fort Colville, businesses and buildings moved to the present location in the Colville River Valley prior to 1882. In January 1883, W. F. Hooker filed the first plat in Stevens County with the name "Belmont" or "Bellmond".  He was encouraged to change the plat name to Colville so that the county seat could be moved to this location. On December 28, 1883, the Stevens County Board of County Commissioners, including county commissioner John U. Hofstetter, held a special session regarding the removal of county records to Belmont from the county seat of Colville, formerly called Pinkney City. In that meeting, commissioners allowed moving the county seat and jail to the town with the name of Colville, if proprietors provided a block of land for them without cost. County officers were allowed to move into a building owned by John U. Hofstetter for two years. On January 1, 1884, the Stevens County courthouse moved to Colville. City tradition says that Colville was founded by John U. Hofstetter. It was officially incorporated as a city on June 7, 1890.

In the 1950s, the Colville Air Force Station was developed and operated 14.7 miles north and east of Colville as part of the Air Defense Command's network of radar stations. A few buildings remain at the site today. It is used largely by paint-ballers.

Geography

Climate
This climatic region is typified by large seasonal temperature differences, with warm to hot (and often humid) summers and cold (sometimes severely cold) winters.  According to the Köppen Climate Classification system, Colville has a continental Mediterranean climate, abbreviated Dsb on climate maps.

Demographics

As of 2000, the median income for a household in the city was $32,168, and the median income for a family was $40,466. Males had a median income of $32,066 versus $21,782 for females. The per capita income for the city was $18,031. About 10.4% of families and 15.5% of the population were below the poverty line, including 14.9% of those under age 18 and 15.7% of those age 65 or over.

2010 census
As of the census of 2010, there were 4,673 people, 2,043 households, and 1,161 families residing in the city. The racial makeup of the city was 92.4% White, 0.1% African American, 2.1% Native American, 0.9% Asian, 0.2% Pacific Islander, 1.2% from other races, and 3.0% from two or more races. Hispanic or Latino of any race were 3.8% of the population.

There were 2,043 households, of which 28.8% had children under the age of 18 living with them, 40.1% were married couples living together, 12.8% had a female householder with no husband present, 3.9% had a male householder with no wife present, and 43.2% were non-families. 38.4% of all households were made up of individuals, and 16.9% had someone living alone who was 65 years of age or older. The average household size was 2.22 and the average family size was 2.95.

The median age in the city was 40.4 years. 24% of residents were under the age of 18; 7.7% were between the ages of 18 and 24; 22.6% were from 25 to 44; 26.9% were from 45 to 64; and 18.9% were 65 years of age or older. The gender makeup of the city was 45.8% male and 54.2% female.

Economy

The area's economy is based chiefly on agriculture and the timber and mining industry, manufacturing, and regional offices of the Washington State Department of Natural Resources and U.S. Forest Service, where the Colville National Forest is headquartered.  Major private employers include Boise Cascade, Vaagen Brothers, Hewes Marine, Colmac Coil Manufacturing, Colmac Industries, and Delta Dental of Washington. Lesser industries are cattle, horse, and hay-farming. Tourism has increased to the nearby National Forest Land for hunting and fishing, and to local farms, orchards and corn mazes.  A blossoming music, arts and crafts community has sprung up around the city's rejuvenated downtown.

References

External links

 
 Colville Chamber of Commerce 
 History of Colville at HistoryLink
 

Cities in Washington (state)
Cities in Stevens County, Washington
County seats in Washington (state)
Washington (state) populated places on the Columbia River
Populated places established in 1825